Thomas Hawthorn Robertson (1908–1962) was a Scottish footballer who played mostly as an outside right, though in his early career he was also utilised as a right back.

He played in the Scottish Football League's top division across a decade for Ayr United, Dundee and Clyde, with his most significant achievement coming at its end, when he was a member of the Clyde team that won the Scottish Cup in 1939. World War II then broke out, effectively ending his senior career; during the conflict, he featured for Ayr United again in unofficial competitions.

Robertson played in one edition of the Glasgow Football Association's annual challenge matches against Sheffield, scoring his side's consolation goal in the 1938 fixture, a 5–1 defeat.

References

1908 births
1962 deaths
Footballers from East Ayrshire
Scottish footballers
Association football outside forwards
Association football defenders
Clyde F.C. players
Ayr United F.C. players
Dundee F.C. players
Scottish Football League players